Tokio is the debut eponymous album by Japanese band Tokio. It was released on November 21, 1994. It reached eighth place on the Oricon weekly chart and charted for thirteen weeks.

Track listing

References 

1994 debut albums
Tokio (band) albums
Japanese-language albums
Sony Music Entertainment Japan albums